Abbasabad-e Fallah (also Romanized as ‘Abbāsābād-e Fallāḩ; also known as ‘Abbāsābād) is a village in Bahreman Rural District, Nuq District, Rafsanjan County, Kerman Province, Iran. At the 2006 census, its population was 69, in 16 families.

References 

Populated places in Rafsanjan County